Vladimir Martinović (Serbian Cyrillic: Владимир Мартиновић; born 6 April 1973) is a Serbian footballer.

External links
 Profile at Reprezentacija.rs
 Profile and stats at Srbijafudbal

Living people
1973 births
People from Zemun
Footballers from Belgrade
Serbian footballers
Serbia and Montenegro international footballers
Serbian expatriate footballers
FK Partizan players
FK Zemun players
FK Vojvodina players
Neuchâtel Xamax FCS players
FC Baden players
FC Wohlen players
Expatriate footballers in Switzerland
Association football defenders
Serbia and Montenegro expatriate footballers
Serbia and Montenegro footballers
Serbia and Montenegro expatriate sportspeople in Switzerland
Serbian expatriate sportspeople in Switzerland